Janine Ditullio is a comedy writer, voice actress, and stand-up comedian.

Career
Ditullio penned the Metalocalypse episode "Dethmas"  with show creator Brendon Small along with several other scripts for season 3 and 4 of the series. She was also the voice of Paula Small in the animated series Home Movies, replacing the original voice actress, Paula Poundstone.  She played a scientist who stabs monkeys on the Onion News Network.  She was the first woman hired to write for Conan O'Brien, and before that, the first woman to write for The Jon Stewart Show in 1994. She also wrote for the late night television talk show Late Night with Jimmy Fallon.

Along with writing partner Kelly Kimball, Ditullio started The Thursday Thing, a monthly workshop where writers, actors, and filmmakers debut new material. Ditullio and Kimball served as co-executive producers on the short lived ABC series My Kind of Town starring Johnny Vaughan.

Ditullio is also the founder and creator of the online streaming technology Chirpbug.

Awards and nominations
Ditullio  was nominated for several Emmy Awards as part of the writing staff for Late Night with Conan O'Brien.
Ditullio  has also won two Writers Guild of America Awards.

References

https://www.imdb.com/name/nm0224366/
http://thisiskmitv.com/2011/10/19/superjail-press-hour-nycc/

External links

The Onion article
Janine-ditullio--genital-mutilation joke
 Janine-ditullio---devil-water joke
 Page 157, Word Freak (2001).Word freak
Late nights real problem. Salon.com
Thursday Thing
Thursday Thing
100-animated-tv-series
LogTV - Live in NYC

Living people
American women comedians
American women screenwriters
Year of birth missing (living people)
21st-century American women